The women's 200 metre individual medley competition of the swimming events at the 1983 Pan American Games took place on 21 August. The last Pan American Games champion was Tracy Caulkins of the United States.

This race consisted of four lengths of the pool, one each in backstroke, breaststroke, butterfly, and freestyle swimming.

Results
All times are in minutes and seconds.

Heats

Final 
The final was held on August 21.

References

Swimming at the 1983 Pan American Games
Pan